One ship and one submarine of the United States Navy have been named USS New Mexico in honor of the state of New Mexico.

  was the lead ship of her class of battleship, commissioned in 1918 and struck in 1947.

See also
 
 
 , formerly SS Mexico and CSS General Bragg

United States Navy ship names